Hardline Entertainment is an American independent record label, created and owned by Ken Seaton. The label started as a management company and developed into an independent record label/management company. Hardline is based in Hermosa Beach, California, United States, and features bands in the alternative music scene, with genres including folk, metal, pop, punk, rap, reggae, rock and  singer/songwriter.

Current/Former Artists

 1208
 Architects
 Authority Zero
 AllurA
 Between Kings
 Blacklisted Me
 Blacklist Royals
 Black President
 The Bunny Gang
 Chaos Delivery Machine
 Chase Long Beach
 Cigar
 The Darlings
 Deviates
 Diego's Umbrella
 Death By Stereo
 Hey Smith
 Hoist The Colors
 HR of Bad Brains
 Lionize
 Long Beach Dub Allstars
 Love Equals Death
 The Manic Low
 Matthew Sikora
 Mercy Music
 Musket
 Nations Afire
 Neo Geo
 Orange
 Pennywise
 Phathom 
 Redfield
 Save Ferris
 Strung Out
 Templeton Pek
 The Sparring
 Wailing Souls
 Thousand Watt Stare
 TSOL
 Versus the World
 Yotam Ben Horin

Associated Links

Easyreadernews.com

American independent record labels
Record labels established in 2000
Punk record labels
Companies based in Los Angeles County, California